Colorado Referendum I was a proposed law that would have established domestic partnerships in the U.S. state of Colorado. The bill was passed by the Colorado General Assembly and was submitted to popular referendum during general elections on November 7, 2006.

The voters were presented with the following summary:

and the following detail:

The referendum specified that a partnership is not a marriage, which "consists of the union of one man and one woman."

In the general election, the proposal was defeated by a margin of 47% for, 53% against.

See also
 Domestic partnership in the United States
 List of Colorado ballot measures
 Colorado Amendment 43 (2006)

Notes

2006 Colorado ballot measures
LGBT in Colorado